Jeff Barry (born Joel Adelberg; April 3, 1938) is an American pop music songwriter, singer, and record producer.  Among the most successful songs that he has co-written in his career are "Do Wah Diddy Diddy", "Da Doo Ron Ron", "Then He Kissed Me", "Be My Baby", "Chapel of Love", and "River Deep - Mountain High" (all written with his then-wife Ellie Greenwich and Phil Spector); "Leader of the Pack" (written with Greenwich and Shadow Morton); "Sugar, Sugar" (written with Andy Kim); "Without Us" (written with Tom Scott).

Early career
Barry was born in Brooklyn to a Jewish family. His parents divorced when he was seven, and his mother moved him and his sister to Plainfield, New Jersey, where they resided for several years before returning to New York.

After graduating from Erasmus Hall High School, Barry served in the Army, then returned to New York where he attended City College. Although he leaned toward a degree in engineering, his main aspiration was to become a singer. He left college in the late '50s to sign with RCA Records, courtesy of music publisher Arnold Shaw. Around this time, he adopted a new name more in tune with show business, borrowing "Jeff" from actor Jeff Chandler and "Barry" from family friends.

Barry recorded several singles for RCA label, including the self-penned "It's Called Rock and Roll", backed with "Hip Couple", released in 1959. The following year, Barry garnered his first significant success as a songwriter with two songs targeting the burgeoning teen market. First, Sam Cooke took Barry's "Teenage Sonata" to No. 22 on the Billboard R&B charts. Later that year, the teen-tragedy ballad "Tell Laura I Love Her", written with lyricist Ben Raleigh, went to No. 7 on the U.S. pop charts for Ray Peterson and to No. 1 on the UK Singles Chart for British singer Ricky Valance.

In the 1960s, Barry had partnered, both professionally and personally, with Ellie Greenwich. The two met in late 1959, although it might not have been for the first time – her maternal uncle was married to his cousin, so they may actually have known each other since childhood. However, their first formal meeting as adults was at a Thanksgiving dinner at the home of mutual relatives. (A few sources erroneously cite the year as 1960.) Fueled by a shared interest in music, a friendship developed that led to romantic involvement some months later, after Barry's first marriage was annulled.

In the summer of 1960, Barry and Greenwich recorded Barry's "Red Corvette", which was released as a single under the name Ellie Gee and The Jets. Greenwich stayed in college at Hofstra (she would graduate in 1962) and commuted to the Brill Building whenever time permitted.  Songwriter-producers Jerry Leiber and Mike Stoller had offered her a job as a staff writer for Trio Music, their publishing company, after Leiber overheard her singing in an office at the Brill Building. Barry was subsequently signed to Trio as well. At first, Barry and Greenwich continued to write songs with other partners. In addition, both became in-demand demo singers.  Some of Barry's demos ended up in the hands of Elvis Presley and other major artists of the day.

Chart success

Barry and Greenwich married in October 1962 and shortly afterward decided to write songs exclusively with each other. Greenwich introduced Barry to her latest partner, songwriter-producer Phil Spector, and the threesome went on to help define the "Girl Group" sound of the early 1960s.  The Barry–Greenwich–Spector team composed several of Spector's biggest hits, including The Crystals' "Da Doo Ron Ron" and "Then He Kissed Me", and The Ronettes' "Be My Baby" and "Baby, I Love You", as well as the holiday perennial "Christmas (Baby Please Come Home)" by Darlene Love.

In early 1963, Barry and Greenwich had chart success with "What A Guy" and "The Kind of Boy You Can't Forget", recorded by the couple under the name The Raindrops for Jubilee Records, with Greenwich providing all the female vocals through the process of overdubbing, while Barry sang backgrounds in a bass voice. (Greenwich's sister, Laura, was drafted for live performances by The Raindrops, though she was little more than a prop, singing into a dead microphone.) The Raindrops also recorded a Jubilee single in late 1963 called "That Boy John" a catchy fusion of jazz and rhythm and blues that reached the middle of the charts; President John F. Kennedy had just been assassinated and, according to Barry and Greenwich, radio stations were loath to play the song. However, in a twist of fate, the B side written by Barry and Greenwich was "Hanky Panky", which would resurface in 1966 as a No. 1 cover version for Tommy James & The Shondells, giving that group its first hit.

In 1964, Leiber and Stoller brought Barry and Greenwich on board their new label, Red Bird Records, as songwriter-producers. Of Red Bird's first 20 releases, 15 hit the charts; all were written and/or produced by the Barry-Greenwich team, including "Chapel of Love", "People Say", and "Iko Iko" by The Dixie Cups, and "Remember (Walkin' in the Sand)" (co-produced by Artie Ripp) and "Leader of the Pack" by The Shangri-Las.  In 1964 alone, the duo were responsible for writing 17 singles that reached the Billboard Hot 100 chart. One of these was "Do Wah Diddy Diddy", originally recorded by the girl group The Exciters, but reworked for a No. 1 pop hit by the British Invasion group Manfred Mann. In 1964, Barry and Greenwich also penned songs for Connie Francis and charted with two Lesley Gore hits, "Maybe I Know" and "Look of Love".

Barry and Greenwich released solo singles under their own names for Red Bird in 1965, Greenwich the haunting "You Don't Know" and Barry the uptempo "I'll Still Love You". However, 1965 was difficult for the pair, since unbeknownst to many, Barry and Greenwich's marriage had begun to unravel. The couple divorced in late 1965 but would continue to work together for much of the following year, and sporadically after that until the late 1960s. Their professional and personal partnerships were the subject of the 1985 Broadway jukebox musical Leader of the Pack.

In early 1966 Barry and Greenwich discovered a talented young singer-songwriter named Neil Diamond and brought him to the attention of Bert Berns, one of the principals of Bang Records. Diamond was signed to the label, and Barry and Greenwich produced Neil's first hits, including "Solitary Man"; "Cherry, Cherry"; "Kentucky Woman"; and "Girl You'll Be a Woman Soon". Barry and Greenwich can be heard singing backgrounds on many of Diamond's Bang recordings.

During the same period, the pair teamed with Phil Spector to write the classics "River Deep, Mountain High", by Ike and Tina Turner and "I Can Hear Music" by The Ronettes and The Beach Boys. Penning songs (especially love songs) together was awkward at best given the circumstances, and Barry and Greenwich's writing partnership soon came to its end. Among Barry's new collaborators were Marty Sanders, a member of the pop group Jay and the Americans, and Bang label CEO Bert Berns, with whom he wrote "Am I Groovin' You?", a top R & B single for Freddie Scott in 1967. Also in 1967, Reparata and the Delrons had a minor hit with Barry's "I'm Nobody's Baby Now".

In late 1966, Barry was asked to produce tracks for the Monkees, a music group put together specifically as the stars of an NBC sitcom, also called The Monkees. Drafted by the show's musical supervisor, Don Kirshner, Barry brought with him a few tunes penned by Neil Diamond for the group to record.  One among them, "I'm a Believer", under Barry's production, would sail up the U.S. charts to No. 1 and become one of the biggest-selling records of all time.  The group also had a hit with another single composed by Diamond and produced by Barry, "A Little Bit Me, a Little Bit You". After Kirshner's dismissal from Colgems Records, however, Barry would not produce songs for the Monkees again until 1970's Changes, which contained many songs co-written by Barry, and their 1971 single Do It in the Name of Love.

Having been removed from the Monkees project, Kirshner became music supervisor for a new Saturday morning cartoon, The Archie Show, in 1968, and enlisted Barry as producer and main songwriter. During the next three years, Barry composed dozens of songs for the fictional Archies group, including the show's theme, "Everything's Archie", and the "Dances of the Week" (a staple of the show's first season). Barry had also recently founded his own label, Steed Records, and one of his most successful recording artists was Montreal native Andy Kim, who had hits with remakes of Barry's Ronettes tunes "Be My Baby" and "Baby, I Love You".  Barry and Kim collaborated on several tunes for The Archies to record, including their best-known single, "Sugar, Sugar", which hit No. 1, became the RIAA Record of the Year for 1969, and earned the group a gold record.

In 1970, Barry wrote and produced singles and albums for Archies lead singer Ron Dante, Bobby Bloom ("Montego Bay"), and Robin McNamara ("Lay a Little Lovin' on Me"), among others.  In addition, Barry penned his first music for motion pictures (Hello Down There (1969) and Where It's At) and wrote the music for and produced Tom Eyen's hit off-Broadway revue The Dirtiest Show in Town. In 1975 he produced "Ooh, I'm Satisfied" for the briefly successful mid-'70s pop singer and later session vocalist, Polly Cutter.

Production and film work
In 1971 Barry moved from New York to California, where he had a production and administration deal with A&M Records for several years. Between 1972 and 1975, he produced hit singles for Nino Tempo and April Stevens (together and separately) and the a cappella vocal group the Persuasions. In subsequent years he shifted his focus to television (writing the theme songs for One Day at a Time, The Jeffersons, and Family Ties) and movies (the score for 1980's The Idolmaker), although he continued his work in the pop music field. "I Honestly Love You", written by Barry with Peter Allen, became a 1974 No. 1 for Olivia Newton-John; and, in 1984, Jeffrey Osborne and Joyce Kennedy hit the Top 40 with another Barry composition, "The Last Time I Made Love", written with Barry Mann and Cynthia Weil.

During the 1970s and 1980s Barry also scored numerous hit songs on the country charts, among them "Out of Hand" by Gary Stewart, "Sayin' Hello, Sayin' I Love You, Sayin' Goodbye" by Jim Ed Brown and Helen Cornelius, "Lie to You for Your Love" by The Bellamy Brothers, a remake of "Chip Chip" (originally a 1962 Gene McDaniels pop smash) by Patsy Sledd, and "Walkin' in the Sun" by Glen Campbell.

In 1990, Barry co-produced the theme song for the television series based on Where's Waldo? In May 1991, Barry and Greenwich were inducted into the Songwriters Hall of Fame. In 2004, Rolling Stone's list of the 500 greatest rock songs included six Greenwich-Barry compositions, more than by any other non-performing songwriting team.

During the mid-1990s, Barry served as president of the National Academy of Songwriters, and in December 1998 he was a recipient of their Lifetime Achievement Award.  In March 2000, Barry filmed a music special for the PBS television network, Chapel of Love: Jeff Barry and Friends. The show featured performances of Barry tunes by several of the artists who made them famous, including the Dixie Cups, the Crystals, Ronnie Spector, Andy Kim, Ray Peterson, and Ron Dante of the Archies.

In recent years, Barry has been involved in several projects, among them the stage musical "The Girl Who Would Be King", written by the husband-and-wife team of Prudence Fraser and Robert Sternin, best known for their writing and production work on the CBS series The Nanny. The musical had its official world premiere in Vero Beach, Florida.

In 2016, Barry composed songs for the musical theater show "Jambalaya the Musical" along with his production partner, Clarence Jey, a US Billboard and viral record producer. Jeff Barry was involved in part of the music in the Hallmark Channel movie titled "My Christmas Love".

In 2019, Barry and his writing partner Clarence Jey composed and wrote songs for Lego City Adventures, a computer-animated television series, produced by The Lego Group, for Nickelodeon television.

Awards and honors
Barry and Greenwich were among the 2010 recipients of the Ahmet Ertegün Award from the Rock and Roll Hall of Fame. Unable to attend the ceremony, Steven Van Zandt accepted the award on Barry's behalf.
Jeff Barry and Ellie Greenwich were inducted into the Songwriters Hall of Fame in 1991.

References

External links

Official fan site
Spectropop
History of Rock 

1938 births
Living people
Jewish American songwriters
American male singer-songwriters
Record producers from New York (state)
Erasmus Hall High School alumni
City College of New York alumni
Musicians from Brooklyn
Musicians from Plainfield, New Jersey
The Monkees
RCA Victor artists
Singer-songwriters from New York (state)
Singer-songwriters from New Jersey